The 1990 All-Pacific-10 Conference football team consists of American football players chosen by various organizations for All-Pacific-10 Conference teams for the 1990 college football season.

Offensive selections

Quarterbacks
Bill Musgrave, Oregon

Running backs
Greg Lewis, Washington
Glyn Milburn, Stanford
Russell White, California

Wide receivers
Ed McCaffrey, Stanford
Gary Wellman, USC

Tight ends
Clarence Williams, Washington St.

Tackles
Bob Whitfield, Stanford
Pat Harlow, USC

Guards
Jeff Pahukoa, Washington
Dean Kirkland, Washington

Centers
Mark Tucker, USC

Defensive selections

Ends
Steve Emtman, Washington
Travis Richardson, Washington

Tackles
Don Gibson, USC
Esera Tuaolo, Oregon St.

Linebackers
Scott Ross, USC
Roman Phifer, UCLA
Peter Brantley, Oregon
Donald Jones, Washington

Cornerbacks
Darryl Lewis, Arizona
Charles Mincy, Washington
Kevin Scott, Stanford

Safeties
Eric Turner, UCLA
Nathan LaDuke, Arizona St.

Special teams

Placekickers
Jason Hanson, Washington St.

Punters
Jason Hanson, Washington St.

Return specialists 
Beno Bryant, Washington

Key

See also
1990 College Football All-America Team

References

All-Pacific-10 Conference Football Team
All-Pac-12 Conference football teams